The ministry of interior of Bosnia and Herzegovina had a few special forces that existed even before the war in Bosnia in 1992.

History 
Bosnian special police units where a few during the war in Bosnia, but there was only one created before the war. In 1982, the MUP special police unit "BOSNA" was created. This unit, like others European units at the time, was created from the threat of terrorism, created by specialists of the police force and very well trained and prepared to fight terrorism. Before the war this unit was active in catching criminals accused of killings, and was sent to very intense stand off situations.

Bosnian war 
At the beginning of the Bosnian war, this unit was placed in the Dom Policije base in Sarajevo. All athletes, predominantly soccer and martial arts athletes, were accepted to this unit. The unit got the official name "Odred za posebne namjene MUP-a R BiH" and their first commander Dragan Vikić, they became known as "Vikicevi specijalci". Along with that units other special police units were created: Jedinica za posebne namjene "Laste" and the Green Berets of MUP in Stari Grad.

Units 
After the Dayton peace agreement, the country has 13 ministries of interior, 2 entity ministries, 10 canton ministries and the ministry of the interior of the District of Brčko. The ministry of interior of the Federation of Bosnia and Herzegovina has a special unit called "FUP" (bs. Federalna uprava policije/en. Federal police administration), also every canton in the Federation of B&H has a special police unit. The Republic of Srpska has a special police unit called "SJP" (bs. Specijalna jedinica policije/en. Special unit of the police). Besides those 12 units, there is a state unit, legally operating on state level called "SIPA" (en. State investigation and protection agency).

References 
Ministry of the interior of the Federation of Bosnia and Herzegovina
Ministry of the interior of Republika Srpska
Ministry of the interior of Brčko District
Law enforcement agencies of Bosnia and Herzegovina